Lehigh Valley Roller Derby (LVRD) is a women's flat track roller derby league based in Bethlehem, Pennsylvania in the Lehigh Valley region of eastern Pennsylvania. The league is a member of the Women's Flat Track Derby Association (WFTDA).

History
Founded as Lehigh Valley Rollergirls in January 2006, the league was the first skater-operated flat track roller derby league in the area. Lehigh Valley was founded by Elaina Borchelt. Lehigh Valley joined the WFTDA Apprentice Program in 2009, and became a full member of the WFTDA in 2010. In 2014 the league was averaging 300 fans at home games at the Independence Family Fun Center in Schnecksville.

The league now hosts home games at Bethlehem Municipal Ice Rink in Bethlehem, Pennsylvania.

Teams
In 2009, the league expanded to a three-team structure, with the Blast Furnace Betties and Metal Vixens home teams feeding the All-Stars, who represent Lehigh Valley against teams from other leagues.

WFTDA rankings

See also
List of roller derby leagues
Women's Flat Track Derby Association

References

Susan Stets, "Lehigh Valley Roller Girls", Lehigh Valley Marketplace, 2010
"Meet your Lehigh Valley Rollergirls!", Noise Nation, March 18, 2011
Will Lewis, "Lehigh Valley Rollergirls are looking for some new teammates" 69 News WFMZ-TZ, Jan 28, 2013
Ann Wlazelek, "Lehigh Valley Rollergirls", Lehigh Valley Marketplace, May 2013
Jadrian Klinger, "The Lehigh Valley Rollergirls", Sept-Oct 2013
Coordinated Health, "Meredith Spirk from the Lehigh Valley Roller Girls" Feb 2015
 Steve Novak, "Lehigh Valley Rollergirls' new season gets rolling", April 04, 2015

External links
Official website
Lehigh Valley Rollergirls Facebook Page
Lehigh Valley Rollergirls Blog
Lehigh Valley Rollergirls at Flat Track Stats

2006 establishments in Pennsylvania
Roller derby leagues established in 2006
Roller derby leagues in Pennsylvania
Sports in Bethlehem, Pennsylvania
Women's Flat Track Derby Association Division 3